Ambulapcha Glacier is a glacier of the Himalayas in the Solukhumbu District of Nepal. It adjoins Imja Glacier to its south and with Lhotse Shar Glacier forms three major glaciers.

References

Glaciers of Nepal
Solukhumbu District